NLRP13, short for NOD-like receptor family pyrin domain containing 13, is an intracellular protein of mammals.  It is also known as NALP13, NOD14, PAN13, and CLR19.7, and is one of 14 pyrin domain containing members of the NOD-like receptor family of cytoplasmic receptors.  The function of NLRP13 is currently unknown.

References

Further reading

LRR proteins
NOD-like receptors